This is a bibliography of works by writer Peter David.

Novels
Alien Nation: Body and Soul, Pocket Books, 1993. 
Battlestar Galactica: Sagittarius Is Bleeding, Tor Books, 2006. 
Darkness of the Light, Tor Books, 2007. 
Dinotopia: The Maze, Random House Books, 1998. 
Fantastic Four: What Lies Between, Pocket Star Books, 2007. 
Howling Mad, Ace Books, 1989. 
What Savage Beast, Diane Pub Co, 1995. 
Tigerheart, Del Rey Books, 2008. 
Election Day, Pocket Star Books, 2008. 
Year of the Black Rainbow (with Claudio Sanchez), 2010
Fable: The Balverine Order, 2010. 
Fable: Blood Ties, 2011. 
The Camelot Papers, 2011. 
Pulling Up Stakes, 2012.
Pulling Up Stakes 2, 2012.
Artful: A Novel, 2014. 
Halo: Hunters in the Dark, 2015.

Modern Arthur
Knight Life, Ace Hardcover, 1987. 
One Knight Only, Ace, 2003. 
Fall of Knight, Ace Hardcover, 2006.

Photon
Written as David Peters:
For the Glory (1987)
High Stakes (1987)
In Search of Mom (1987)
This Is Your Life, Bhodi Li (1987)
Exile (1987)
Skin Deep (1988)

Psi-Man
Written as David Peters:
Mind-Force Warrior, Diamond/Charter, 1990. 
Deathscape, Diamond/Charter, 1990. 
Main Street D.O.A., Diamond/Charter, 1991. 
The Chaos Kid, Diamond/Charter, 1991. 
Stalker, Diamond/Charter, 1991. 
Haven, Diamond/Charter, 1992.

Sir Apropos of Nothing
Sir Apropos of Nothing, Pocket Books, 2002. 
The Woad to Wuin, Pocket Star, 2003. 
Tong Lashing, Pocket Star, 2003. 
Sir Apropos of Nothing and the Adventure of the Receding Heir (short story, published in the anthology Heroes in Training, 2007)
Gypsies, Vamps, and Thieves (with Robin Riggs), IDW Publishing, 2009. 
Pyramid Schemes, Second Age, Inc., 2016.

Movie novelizations
The Return of Swamp Thing, Berkley, 1989. 
The Rocketeer, Bantam, 1991. 
Batman Forever (with Janet Scott-Batchler, Lee Batchler, Akiva Goldsman, and Bob Kane), Warner Books Inc., 1995. 
Fantastic Four, Pocket Star, 2005. 
Hulk, Del Rey, 2003. 
The Incredible Hulk, Del Rey, 2008. 
Spider-Man, Del Rey, 2002. 
Spider-Man 2, Del Rey, 2004. 
Spider-Man 3, Del Rey, 2007.
Iron Man, Del Rey, 2008.
Transformers: Dark of the Moon, 2011
Battleship, 2012
After Earth, 2013

Babylon 5
Based on an outline by J. Michael Straczynski:
Legions of Fire, Book 1—The Long Night of Centauri Prime, Del Rey, 1999. 
Legions of Fire, Book 2—Armies of Light and Dark, Del Rey, 2000. 
Legions of Fire, Book 3—Out of the Darkness, Del Rey, 2000. 
Babylon 5: In the Beginning, Del Rey, 1995.  (Movie novelization; Based on a screenplay by J. Michael Straczynski)
Babylon 5: Thirdspace, Del Rey, 1998.  (Movie novelization; Based on a screenplay by J. Michael Straczynski)

Comics
Action Comics Weekly #608–620 (Green Lantern serial; #615, 619–620 plot with Richard Howell) (1988)
The Phantom #1-4 (1988)
Justice #15-32 (1988-1989)
Dreadstar #41-64 (1989-1991)
Creepy: The Limited Series #1-4 (1992)
 Sachs and Violens #1-4 (1993)Captain America Drug War (1994)Dreadstar #0.5, 1-6 (1994)DC vs. Marvel (#2 and #4 only) (1996)Heroes Reborn: The Return #1-4 (1997)Babylon 5: In Valen's Name (with J. Michael Straczynski), DC Comics, 1998. Powerpuff Girls: Hide and Go Mojo (2002) The Haunted #1-4 (2002)The Haunted: Gray Matters #1 (2002)Red Sonja vs. Thulsa Doom #1-4 (with Luke Lieberman and Will Conrad), Dynamite Entertainment, 2006. Spike: Old Times (with Scott Tipton and Fernando Goni), IDW Publishing, 2006. Spike vs. Dracula #1-5 (with Joe Corroney and Mike Ratera), IDW Publishing, 2006. 
 Wonder Man: My Fair Super Hero #1-5 (2007)
 The Scream #1-4 (2007)
"One Fateful Knight" in the anthology Short Trips: The Quality of Leadership, Big Finish Productions, 2008. Halo: Helljumper #1-5 (2009)Deadpool’s Art of War #1-4 (2014)The Phantom: Danger in the Forbidden City #1-6 (2014)

AquamanThe Atlantis Chronicles #1-7 (1990).Aquaman: Time and Tide #1-4  (with Kirk Jarvinen) (1993), Aquaman Vol.5 #0-46 DC Comics (1994–1998)

AvengersThe Last Avengers Story #1-2 (1995)Avengers: Season One (2012)Avengers: Back to Basics #1-6 (2018)

Captain Marvel (Marvel Comics)Captain Marvel Vol. 4 #1–35, 0 (1999-2002)Captain Marvel Vol. 5 #1–25 (2002-2004)Genis-Vell: Captain Marvel #1-5 (2022)

Fallen AngelFallen Angel  #1–20 (DC) (2003-2005)Fallen Angel #1–33 (IDW) (2005-2008)Fallen Angel: Reborn #1–4 (2010)Fallen Angel: Return of the Son #1–4 (2011)

Fantastic FourBefore the Fantastic Four: Reed Richards #1-3 (2000)Marvel 1602: Fantastick Four #1-5 (2005)Fantastic Four: The Prodigal Sun #1 (2019)Silver Surfer: The Prodigal Sun #1 (2019)Guardians of the Galaxy: The Prodigal Sun #1 (2019)New Fantastic Four #1-5 (2022)

The Incredible HulkHulk Visionaries: Peter David, Volume 1 (with Todd McFarlane), Marvel Comics, 2005. . Collects Incredible Hulk #331–339 (1987–1988).Hulk Visionaries: Peter David, Volume 2 (with Todd McFarlane, Erik Larsen, and Jeff Purves), Marvel Comics, 2005. . Collects Incredible Hulk #340–348 (1988).Hulk Visionaries: Peter David, Volume 3 (with Jeff Purves, Alex Saviuk, and Keith Pollard), Marvel Comics, 2006. . Collects Incredible Hulk #349–354 and Web of Spider-Man #44 (1988–1989).Hulk Visionaries: Peter David, Volume 4 (with Bob Harras, Jeff Purves, and Dan Reed), Marvel Comics, 2007. . Collects Incredible Hulk #355–363 and Marvel Comics Presents #26 and #45 (1989–1990).Hulk Visionaries: Peter David, Volume 5 (with Jeff Purves, Dale Keown, Sam Kieth, and Angel Medina), Marvel Comics, 2008. . Collects Incredible Hulk #364–372 and Incredible Hulk Annual #16 (1989–1990).Hulk Visionaries: Peter David, Volume 6 (with Dale Keown,), Marvel Comics, 2009. . Collects Incredible Hulk #373–382 (1990–1991).Hulk Visionaries: Peter David, Volume 7 (with Dale Keown,), Marvel Comics, 2010. . Collects Incredible Hulk #383–389 and Incredible Hulk Annual #17 (1991–1992).Hulk Visionaries: Peter David, Volume 8 (with Dale Keown), Marvel Comics, 2011. . Collects Incredible Hulk #390–396, X-Factor #76 and Incredible Hulk Annual #18 (1992).Epic Collection 19: Ghosts of the Past (with Dale Keown), Marvel Comics, 2015. . Collects Incredible Hulk #397–406 and Incredible Hulk Annual #18–19 (1992).Epic Collection 20: Future Imperfect, Marvel Comics, 2017 . Collects Incredible Hulk #407–419, Annual #20, Incredible Hulk: Future Imperfect #1–2 and material from Marvel Holiday Special #3Epic Collection 21: Fall of the Pantheon, Marvel Comics 2018.. Collects Tales to Astonish (1994) #1, Incredible Hulk vs. Venom #1, Incredible Hulk #420–435Epic Collection 22: Ghosts of the Future, Marvel Comics, 2019.. Collects Incredible Hulk #436–448, Savage Hulk #1 and more.Tempest Fugit (with Lee Weeks), Marvel Comics, 2005. . Collects Incredible Hulk Vol. 2 #77–82.House of M: Incredible Hulk, Marvel Comics, 2006 . Collects Incredible Hulk Vol. 2 #83-87Incredible Hulk #328, 331–359, 361–467, −1 (1987–1998)Incredible Hulk Annual #16–20 (1990–1994)Incredible Hulk Vol. 2 #33 (reprints Incredible Hulk #335), #77–87 (2005)Incredible Hulk: Future Imperfect #1–2 (1992)Incredible Hulk vs. Venom #1 (1994)Tales to Astonish vol. 3 #1 (1994)Prime vs. The Incredible Hulk #0 (1995)Savage Hulk #1 (1996)Incredible Hulk/Hercules: Unleashed #1 (1996)Hulk/Pitt #1 (1997)Hulk: The End #1 (2002)What If General Ross Had Become the Hulk? #1 (2005)Hulk: Destruction #1–4 (2005)Giant-Size Hulk #1 (2006)World War Hulk Prologue: World Breaker #1 (2007)Marvel Adventures: Hulk #13-16 (2008)Hulk vs. Fin Fang Foom #1 (2008)The Incredible Hulk: The Big Picture #1 (2008)Hulk: Broken Worlds #1 (2009)Future Imperfect: Warzones! #1-5 (2015)Secret Wars: Battleworld #4 (2015)Incredible Hulk: Last Call #1 (2019)Maestro #1-5 (2020)Maestro: War and Pax #1-5 (2021)Maestro: World War M #1-5 (2022)Joe Fixit #1-5 (2023)

She-HulkThe Sensational She-Hulk #12 (1989)She-Hulk Vol. 2 #22–38 (2007–2009)She-Hulk: Cosmic Collision #1 (2009)She-Hulk: Sensational #1 (2010)

Soulsearchers & CompanySoulsearchers & Company: On the Case! #1-82 (1993-2007) (with Richard Howell, Amanda Conner, Jim Mooney)

Spider-ManThe Death of Jean DeWolff (with Rich Buckler), Marvel Comics, 1991. Amazing Spider-Man #266–267, 278, 289, 525Peter Parker, The Spectacular Spider-Man #103, 105-110, 112-113, 115-119, 121-123, 128-129Peter Parker, The Spectacular Spider-Man Annual #5–6The Spectacular Spider-Man #134–136Web of Spider-Man #7, 12–13. 40–44, 49Web of Spider-Man Annual #6Spider-Man Special Edition #1 (1992)Spider-Man 2099 #1–44 (1993–1996)Spider-Man 2099 Annual #1Spider-Man 2099 Meets Spider-Man #1Spider-Man Gen¹³ #1 (1996)Spider-Man Family Featuring Spider-Clan #1 (2005)Friendly Neighborhood Spider-Man #1, 4–23 (2005-2007)Friendly Neighborhood Spider-Man Annual #1Spider-Man: The Other (with Reginald Hudlin, J. Michael Straczynski, Pat Lee, Mike Wieringo, and Mike Deodato), Marvel Comics, 2006. Marvel Adventures: Spider-Man #17–19 (2006), 31 (2007)What If? Spider-Man: The Other (2007)Amazing Spider-Man Vol. 3 #1 (2014)Spider-Man 2099 Vol. 2 #1–12 (2014–2015)Spider-Man 2099 Vol. 3 #1-25 (2015–2017)Secret Wars 2099 #1-5 (2015)Ben Reilly: The Scarlet Spider #1-25 (2017-2018)Sensational Spider-Man: Self-Improvement (2019)Symbiote Spider-Man #1-5 (2019)Absolute Carnage: Symbiote Spider-Man #1 (2019)Symbiote Spider-Man: Alien Reality #1-5 (2019-2020)Symbiote Spider-Man: King in Black #1-5 (2020-2021)Symbiote Spider-Man: Crossroads #1-5 (2021)

Spyboy
Written with Pop Mhan and Norman Lee.SpyBoy #1-12, 13.1-13.3, 14-17 (1999-2001)SpyBoy: Motorola Special (2000)SpyBoy/Young Justice #1-3 (2002)SpyBoy Special: The Manchurian Candy Date (2002)SpyBoy: Final Exam #1-4 (2004)

SupergirlSupergirl Vol. 4 #1–80, Annual #1–2, Supergirl Plus #1, #1000000 (with Gary Frank and Terry Dodson), DC Comics (1996-2003) Many Happy Returns (written with Ed Benes), DC Comics, 2003. 

WolverineWolverine Volume 2 #9,11-16, 24, 44 (1989, 1990, 1991)Wolverine: Rahne of Terra (1991)Wolverine: Global Jeopardy #1 (1993)Wolverine: Blood Hungry, collecting Marvel Comics Presents #85-92, Wolverine serial (1993)Wolverine: First Class #13-21 (2009)

X-FactorX-Factor vol. 1 #55, 70–89 (1990-1993)X-Factor Annual #6–8MadroX: Multiple Choice (with Pablo Raimondi), Marvel Comics, 2005. X-Factor Vol. 3 #1–50, #200–262 (2005–2013)X-Factor: The Quick and the Dead #1X-Factor: Layla Miller #1Nation X: X-Factor #1All-New X-Factor #1–20 (2014–2015)X-Men Legends vol. 1 #5-6 (2021)

Young JusticeYoung Justice #1–7, 9–21, 23–55, & 1000000 DC Comics (1998–2003)Young Justice: Sins of Youth #1-2 (2000)Young Justice: A League of Their Own (with Todd Nauck), DC Comics, 2000. 

Star Trek
Collections of DC Comics issuesThe Trial of James T. Kirk (Star Trek Comics Classics trade paperback, reprint of DC Comics issues, with James W. Fry and Gordon Purcell), Titan Books, 2006. Death Before Dishonor (Star Trek Comics Classics trade paperback, reprint of DC Comics issues, with James W. Fry and Arne Starr), Titan Books, 2006. Star Trek Archives Volume 1: Best of Peter David, 2008, ISBN-13 ‏  978-1600102424 

Captain Sulu AdventuresCacophony (under the pseudonym J.J. Molloy), Simon & Schuster (Trade Division), 1994. Captain's TableOnce Burned, Pocket Books, 1998. Tales From The Captain's Table, story "Pain Management", Pocket Books, 2005. Deep Space NineThe Siege, Pocket Books, 1993.Wrath of the Prophets (with Robert Greenberger and Michael Jan Friedman), Pocket Books, 1997. GatewaysCold Wars, Pocket Books, 2001. What Lay Beyond (with Diane Carey, Keith R. A. DeCandido, Christie Golden, Robert Greenberger, Susan Wright), Pocket Books, 2002. Starfleet AcademyWorf's First Adventure, Simon & Schuster, 1993. Line of Fire, Simon & Schuster, 1993. Starfleet Academy—Survival, Simon & Schuster, 1994. New FrontierHouse of Cards, Pocket Books, 1997. Into the Void, Pocket Books, 1997. The Two Front War, Pocket Books, 1997. End Game, Pocket Books, 1997. Martyr, Pocket Books, 1998. Fire on High, Pocket Books, 1998. Star Trek: New Frontier (collection), Pocket Books, 1998. The Quiet Place, Pocket Books, 1999. Dark Allies, Pocket Books, 1999. Double Time (graphic novel), DC Comics, 2000. Excalibur, Book 1: Requiem, Pocket Books, 2000. Excalibur, Book 2: Renaissance, Pocket Books, 2000. Excalibur, Book 3: Restoration, Pocket Books, 2001. Being Human, Pocket Books, 2001. Gods Above, Pocket Books, 2003. Stone and Anvil, Pocket Books, 2004. After the Fall, Pocket Books, 2004. Missing in Action, Pocket Books, 2006. Treason, Pocket Books, 2009. Blind Man's Bluff, Gallery Books, 2011. The Returned: Part 1, Pocket Books, 2015.The Returned: Part 2, Pocket Books, 2015.The Returned: Part 3, Pocket Books, 2015.The Next GenerationStrike Zone, Pocket Books, 1989. A Rock and a Hard Place, Pocket Books, 1990. Vendetta, Pocket Books, 1991. Q-in-Law, Pocket Books, 1991. Imzadi, Pocket Books, 1993. Q-Squared, Pocket Books, 1994. Double Helix—Double or Nothing, Pocket Books, 1999. Imzadi II: Triangle, Pocket Books, 1999. I, Q (with John de Lancie), Pocket Books, 2000. Imazadi Forever, Pocket Books, 2003. Before Dishonor, Pocket Books, 2007. Star Trek: The Next Generation - IDW 2020(comic special), IDW Comics, 2019.The Original SeriesThe Rift, Pocket Books, 1991. The Disinherited (with Michael Jan Friedman and Robert Greenberger), Pocket Books, 1992. The Captain's Daughter, Pocket Books, 1995. 

Non-fictionBeam Me Up, Scotty (co-author, autobiography of James Doohan), 1996. 

Short fiction

"The Robin Hood Fan's Tale," The Fans are Buried Tales, Crazy 8 Press ISBN 978-1732457744

Essays and instructionalBut I Digress, Krause Publications, 1994. Writing for Comics with Peter David, Impact Books, 2006. More Digressions: A New Collection of 'But I Digress' Columns, Mad Norwegian Press, 2009. Mr. Sulu Grabbed My Ass, and Other Highlights from a Life in Comics, Novels, Television, Films and Video Games'', McFarland, 2020.

External links
 Bibliography on Peter David Official site

Bibliographies of American writers
Bibliographies by writer
Science fiction bibliographies

Lists of comics by creator
Comics by Peter David